| tries = {{#expr:
 11 + 3 + 8 + 2 + 11 + 2 + 3 + 2 
 + 0 + 11 + 1 + 6 + 1 + 8 + 1 + 5
 + 3 + 3 + 0 + 7 + 2 + 2 + 5 + 2
 + 4 + 3 + 3 + 1 + 4 + 1 + 2 + 2
 + 2 + 2 + 8 + 4 + 4 + 3 + 6 + 1
}}
| top point scorer =  Edoardo Stella (43 points)
| top try scorer =  Akaki Tabutsadze (6 tries) Taylor Gontineac (6 tries)
| previous year = 2022
| previous tournament = 2022 Rugby Europe Championship
| next year = 2024
| next tournament = 2024 Rugby Europe Championship
}}

The 2023 Rugby Europe Championship is the seventh Rugby Europe Championship, the annual rugby union for the top European national teams outside the Six Nations Championship, and the 53rd edition of the competition (including all its previous incarnations as the FIRA Tournament, Rugby Union European Cup, FIRA Nations Cup, FIRA Trophy and European Nations Cup). 

Eight teams will take part in the 2023 Championship, up from six in previous tournaments, due to a reorganisation of the various flights of European international competition. The Championship will be contested by Belgium, Georgia, Germany, Poland, the Netherlands, Portugal, Romania, and Spain. 

Russia, who competed in the 2022 Championship were relegated as a result of suspension due to their country's 2022 Russian invasion of Ukraine. The remaining five teams (Georgia, the Netherlands, Portugal, Romania, and Spain) will be joined by the top three teams from the 2021–22 Rugby Europe Trophy, which Belgium won. 

Georgia enters the tournament as defending champions. They topped the table in the 2022 tournament, claiming their 14th title. The serpentine system is applied to allocate each team to their respective groups. Each team will play a total of five games (three round robin group matches to determine the team's path and two play-off matches). Seeding (for a group) and relegation are calculated over a two-year cycle, as is the promotion from the Trophy competition.

Participants

Tables and Fixtures

Group A

Week 1

Week 2

Week 3

Group B

Week 1

Week 2

Week 3

Ranking Finals

Semi-finals

Seventh-place final

Fifth-place final

Grand Finals

Semi-finals

Bronze Final

Final

Final Placings

International broadcasters

See also
 Rugby Europe International Championships
 Antim Cup

References

Rugby Europe Championship
2022–23 Rugby Europe International Championships
2023 rugby union tournaments for national teams
2022–23 in European rugby union
2023 in Belgian sport
2023 in Dutch sport
2023 in German sport
2023 in Polish sport
2023 in Portuguese sport
2023 in Romanian sport
2023 in Spanish sport
Rugby Europe Championship
Rugby Europe Championship
Sports events affected by the 2022 Russian invasion of Ukraine